Take Me Over may refer to:

 "Take Me Over" (Cut Copy song), 2010
 "Take Me Over" (Peking Duk song), 2014